Pavel Soukeník (15 November 1962 in Nivnice – 17 December 1988 in Bučovice) was a Czechoslovakian sport shooter. He competed at the 1988 Summer Olympics in the men's 50 metre rifle three positions event, in which he tied for 15th place; the men's 50 metre rifle prone event, in which he placed fourth; and the men's 10 metre air rifle event, in which he tied for 17th place.

He died at the age of 26 in a car accident.

References

1962 births
1988 deaths
ISSF rifle shooters
Czech male sport shooters
Czechoslovak male sport shooters
Shooters at the 1988 Summer Olympics
Olympic shooters of Czechoslovakia
People from Uherské Hradiště District
Road incident deaths in Czechoslovakia
Sportspeople from the Zlín Region